is an American actress, best known for her roles as Tatsu Yamashiro/Katana in the 2016 superhero film Suicide Squad and as Kimiko Miyashira/The Female in the Amazon Prime original series The Boys (2019–present). Fukuhara is also known for voicing the character Glimmer from the Netflix series She-Ra and the Princesses of Power and Kipo from Kipo and the Age of Wonderbeasts.

Early life and education
Fukuhara was born to Japanese parents in Los Angeles. Her first language was Japanese, and she attended Japanese language school on Saturdays for 11 years. She has a younger brother. Fukuhara began practicing karate in middle school, and became a brown-striped belt before leaving for college.

Fukuhara attended University of California, Los Angeles (UCLA) while working as a reporter for a sports show on NHK in Japan. She was a member of the a cappella group Medleys, whose alumni include fellow actress Kelly Marie Tran. Fukuhara graduated from UCLA in 2014 with a Bachelor of Arts in Sociology and a minor in Theater.

Career
Fukuhara got her start in the entertainment industry in middle school when she was cast as a host for Movie Surfers, a short form entertainment news program on the Disney Channel.

Prior to her acting debut, Fukuhara worked various part-time jobs, including as a translator, subtitle editor, and waitress at a reggae-themed sushi restaurant.

In 2016, Fukuhara made her film debut as Katana in the DC Comics superhero film Suicide Squad, which was released in August 2016. Although she had prior martial arts experience, Fukuhara trained for about two months during pre-production in order to learn how to wield a sword correctly.

In 2019, Fukuhara appeared in Stray (alongside Christine Woods, Miyavi, and Ross Partridge).

Fukuhara voiced the characters Sewer Queen and Alexis in the Cartoon Network series Craig of the Creek. In 2018, she began voicing Glimmer in She-Ra and the Princesses of Power, a reboot of the 1985 animated television series.

In 2019, she began starring as Kimiko in the Amazon Prime series The Boys, based on the comic book of the same name.

In 2020, she voiced the titular lead character of Kipo and the Age of Wonderbeasts. The series is based on the short-lived webcomic named Kipo.

Filmography

Video games

References

External links

 
 

1992 births
Living people
21st-century American actresses
Actresses from Los Angeles
American actresses of Japanese descent
American film actors of Asian descent
American film actresses
American television actresses
American voice actresses
Venice High School (Los Angeles) alumni
University of California, Los Angeles alumni